Printer's Alley is a famous alley in downtown Nashville, Tennessee, U.S., between Third and Fourth Avenues, running from Union Street to Commerce Street.  The portion of the alley between Union and Church Street is the home of a nightclub district that dates back to the 1940s.

History 
At the beginning of the 20th century, Printer's Alley was home to a thriving publishing industry. The area was home to two large newspapers, ten print shops, and thirteen publishers.

When Printer's Alley first became a nightclub and entertainment district, sale of liquor for on premise consumption was illegal in Nashville (and throughout Tennessee).  Restaurants and clubs in the alley served liquor anyway, often claiming it had been "brown bagged" (brought in by customers).  Law enforcement agencies normally looked the other way when such sales occurred.  Liquor sales in restaurants were finally legalized in 1968.

One famous Printer's Alley club was Jimmy Hyde's Carousel Club, a jazz venue frequented by many Nashville musicians, among them a significant number of studio musicians who loved jazz despite spending their day backing country singers.  These players would jam after the sessions were done and the music was often jazz. Among them were Chet Atkins, Floyd Cramer, Boots Randolph, Bob Moore, Brenton Banks, Buddy Harman and Hank Garland.  Later, Randolph purchased the Carousel.

In 1998, murder came to the Alley when longtime club proprietor David "Skull" Schulman was murdered by a robber shortly before his club was due to open.

Paul McCartney mentioned Printer's Alley in his song "Sally G.", released as the B_side of Paul McCartney & Wings 1974 single "Junior's farm".

Today

Bourbon Street Blues and Boogie Bar, Alley Taps, Ms. Kelli's Karaoke, Fleet Street Pub, Skulls Rainbow Room,  Jane’s Hideaway, Jeff Ruby’s Steakhouse, Black Rabbit, and Daddy’s Dogs are all found in Printer's Alley today.

See also
Music Row
Tin Pan Alley

References

Culture of Nashville, Tennessee
Economy of Nashville, Tennessee
Transportation in Nashville, Tennessee
Tourist attractions in Nashville, Tennessee